The Victoria Park Stakes  is a Canadian Thoroughbred horse race run annually since 1988 at Woodbine Racetrack in Toronto, Ontario. Raced in early to mid June over a distance of one and one-eighth miles, it is open to three-year-old horses. It was run on dirt until 2006 when the new synthetic Polytrack surface was installed.

Named for Canadian Horse Racing Hall of Fame inductee, Victoria Park, the ungraded stakes race is considered the last prep for the Queen's Plate for any Canadian-bred participants.

Records
Speed  record: 
 1:49.80 - Jail Break (1997)

Most wins by an owner:
 2 - Earle I. Mack (1995, 2006)

Most wins by a jockey:
 3 - Dave Penna (1989, 1990, 1995)
 3 - Todd Kabel (1994, 2000, 2001)

Most wins by a trainer:
 5 - Roger Attfield (1991, 1993, 1995, 2005, 2015)

Winners of the Victoria Park Stakes

*In 1998, Kinkennie finished first but was disqualified and set back to fifth.

Ungraded stakes races in Canada
Flat horse races for three-year-olds
Recurring events established in 1988
Woodbine Racetrack